{{DISPLAYTITLE:C13H17NO}}
The molecular formula C13H17NO (molar mass : 203.28 g/mol, exact mass : 203.131014) may refer to:

 Crotamiton
 Deschloroketamine
 5-EAPB
 5-MBPB
 6-EAPB
 α-Pyrrolidinopropiophenone
 N-Phenethyl-4-piperidinone